The fifth round (also known as the Hexagonal or Hex) of CONCACAF matches for 2018 FIFA World Cup qualification was played from 11 November 2016 to 10 October 2017. Mexico, Costa Rica, and Panama qualified for the 2018 FIFA World Cup, while Honduras advanced to the inter-confederation play-offs. The United States (who failed to qualify for the World Cup for the first time in 32 years) and Trinidad and Tobago were eliminated in this round.

Format
A total of six teams which had advanced from the fourth round (the three group winners and the three group runners-up) played against each other home-and-away in a double round-robin format in a single group. The top three teams in the group qualified for the 2018 FIFA World Cup, and the fourth-placed team advanced to the inter-confederation play-offs to face the fifth-placed team from the AFC. This stage is referred to as the Hexagonal or Hex, and has been used by CONCACAF to determine its World Cup finals entrants since the qualification tournament for the 1998 FIFA World Cup. The United States, Mexico, and Costa Rica have qualified for every "Hex" since it first began in 1998.

The draw for the fifth round (to decide the fixtures) was held on 8 July 2016, 10:00 EDT (UTC−4), at the CONCACAF headquarters in Miami Beach, United States. As the draw was held before the fourth round was completed, only Mexico was assured a Hex spot as Group A winners of the fourth round qualifiers; the rest of the fourth round qualifiers were not known at the time of the draw.

Qualified teams

The draw position of each team (to decide the fixtures) was as follows.

Note: Bolded teams qualified for the World Cup. Honduras advanced to the inter-confederation play-offs.

Standings

Matches

Matchday 1

Matchday 2

Matchday 3

Matchday 4

Matchday 5

Matchday 6

Matchday 7

Matchday 8

Matchday 9

Matchday 10

Goalscorers

Notes

References

External links

Qualifiers – North, Central America and Caribbean: Round 5, FIFA.com
World Cup Qualifying – Men, CONCACAF.com

5
Qual5
Qual5
Mexico at the 2018 FIFA World Cup
Costa Rica at the 2018 FIFA World Cup
Panama at the 2018 FIFA World Cup